Giovenale Vegezzi Ruscalla (4 December 1799, Turin, Italy - December 1885, Turin), was a liberal Italian journalist, foreign honorary member of the Romanian Academy, and secretary to the Subalpine Agrarian Association. He traveled to Transylvania and Banat on a study trip in 1830 and was an honorary citizen as a Romanian diplomat. He translated poems of the Romanian poet and playwright Vasile Alecsandri and taught a history course and Romanian literature at the University of Turin. At the Congress of Paris 1856 Vegezzi Ruscalla successfully debated in favour of Romanian independence (out of Moldavia and Wallachia).

Bibliography

Predescu, Lucian, Romanian Encyclopedia. Thinking, Saeculum Publishing, Bucharest, 1999 
Suciu, Dumitru, Austro-history and national struggle of the Romanians in Transylvania (1848 - 1867), Albatros Publishing House, Bucharest, 2000  pp. 299–317

References

1799 births
19th-century Italian women writers
18th-century Italian people
Journalists from Turin
Italian male journalists
Italian translators
Translators to Italian
Translators from Romanian
Academic staff of the University of Turin
1885 deaths
19th-century translators